The 2012–13 Boston Bruins season was their 89th season in the National Hockey League (NHL). The regular season was reduced from its usual 82 games to 48 due to a lockout. In the playoff, the Bruins eliminated the Pittsburgh Penguins in four games to capture the Eastern Conference championship, but lost the 2013 Stanley Cup Finals to the Western Conference playoff champion Chicago Blackhawks in six games.

The Bruins also traded for veteran Jaromir Jagr for the remainder of the season and after playing a brief stint with the Dallas Stars, he made his first Stanley Cup Finals since 1992 with the Pittsburgh Penguins, coincidentally it was also against the Blackhawks.

Off-season
On June 3, 2012, it was announced that goaltender Tim Thomas was planning on taking a year off from hockey. Thomas had continued to make headlines for things outside of hockey, mainly his political views, which he demonstrated by boycotting the Bruins Stanley Cup visit to the White House and posting on his Facebook page. He was traded to the New York Islanders on February 7, 2013. Like the rest of the teams in the NHL, the Boston Bruins had their season delayed and shortened by the 2012–13 NHL lockout. The Bruins traded Benoit Pouliot in the off-season and lost four other players to free-agency, but otherwise kept the team intact.

Standings

Schedule and results

Regular season
The Bruins had the fewest power-play opportunities in the NHL during the regular season, with just 122, and scored the fewest power-play goals, with 18.

The Bruins were not shut-out in any of their 48 regular-season games.

Playoffs

 Scorer of game-winning goal in italics

Player statistics
Updated as of June 18, 2013

Skaters
Note: GP = Games played; G = Goals; A = Assists; Pts = Points; +/- = Plus-minus; PIM = Penalty minutes

†Denotes player spent time with another team before joining Bruins. Stats reflect time with the Bruins only.
‡Denotes player was traded mid-season. Stats reflect time with the Bruins only.
(G)Denotes goaltender.
Team PIM totals include bench infractions.

Goaltenders
Note: GPI = Games played in; MIN = Minutes played; GAA = Goals against average; W = Wins; L = Losses; OT = Overtime/shootout losses; SO = Shutouts; SA = Shots against; GA = Goals against; SV% = Save percentage

Awards and records

Awards
On April 28, prior to the game against the Ottawa Senators, the team announced its award winners for the season.

Patrice Bergeron was also named Second Star of the Week on March 3, 2013.

Milestones

Dougie Hamilton, Carl Soderberg, Ryan Spooner and Jamie Tardif all made their NHL debuts during the 2013 season.

Transactions 
The Bruins have been involved in the following transactions during the 2012–13 season, or the off-season between the previous season and this season.

Trades

Free agents signed

Free agents lost

Claimed via waivers

Lost via waivers

Lost via retirement

Player signings

Draft picks

Boston Bruins' picks at the 2012 NHL Entry Draft, held in Pittsburgh, Pennsylvania on June 22 & 23, 2012. 

Draft notes 
 The Boston Bruins' second-round pick went to the Toronto Maple Leafs as the result of a February 18, 2011, trade that sent Tomas Kaberle to the Bruins in exchange for Joe Colborne, 2011 first-round pick and this conditional pick (the Bruins reached the 2011 Stanley Cup Finals, winning the Cup, or if Kaberle had re-signed with Bruins after 2010–11 season).
 The Boston Bruins' fourth-round pick went to the Carolina Hurricanes as a result of a July 5, 2011, trade that sent Joe Corvo to the Bruins in exchange for this pick.
 The Tampa Bay Lightning's fifth-round pick went to the Boston Bruins as a result of a June 23, 2012, trade that sent the rights to Benoit Pouliot to the Lightning in exchange for Michel Ouellet and this pick.

See also 
 2012–13 NHL season

References

Boston Bruins seasons
B
Boston Bruins
Eastern Conference (NHL) championship seasons
Boston Bruins
Boston Bruins
Boston Bruins
2012 in Boston
2013 in Boston